Beata Falk (born February 17, 1989) is a Swedish orienteering competitor, and junior world champion.

She became Junior World Champion in the relay in Gothenburg in 2008, together with Jenny Lönnkvist and Lina Strand, and received silver medals in the middle distance (behind Venla Niemi) and in the long course (behind Jenny Lönnkvist).

She competed at the 2010 World Orienteering Championships in Trondheim, where she qualified for the sprint final.

References

External links
 

1989 births
Living people
Swedish orienteers
Female orienteers
Foot orienteers
21st-century Swedish people
Junior World Orienteering Championships medalists